Andara Vaas Patabedige Vincent (7 November 1922 – 6 May 2004 වින්සන්ට් වාස්), popularly known as Vincent Vaas was an actor in Sri Lankan cinema. Often considered one of the best character actors in Sinhala cinema, he made several critically acclaimed roles in a career spanned for more than five decades. Apart from cinema, he was also a singer and musician.

Personal life
Vaas was born on 7 November 1922 in Beruwala, Kalutara, Sri Lanka as the seventh child in a family of nine siblings. His father Leon Vaas was a talented violinist. His mother Monica Fernando was a housewife. He studied at the Roman Catholic College in Beruwela.

He was married to Agnes Cooray where the wedding was celebrated in 1959. He first met her at the Wadduwa church. Vincent and Agnes are about 18 years apart. The couple has one sons: Milal and Chinthaka, and three daughters: Virani, Janaki and Inoka.

Chinthaka Vaas studied at Saint Joseph's College, Colombo and is also an actor who acted in the films: Aba, Address Na, Usaviya Nihadai, Ginnen Upan Seethala and television serials: Modara Bambaru, Golu Thaththa and Deyyange Rate. Chinthaka works at Lake House. Chinthaka is married to Asha Madushani. He met her while Chinthaka was singing in church. They have three children: Ginod Joseph, Minod Rafail, and Vindali Marieta.

Towards the end of his life, Vass and his family lived in a small house in Mahabudgamuwa. He died on 6 May 2004 at the age of 81.

Career
He loved drama from the time he was at the school. He took to the streets by singing Christmas carols and gradually became a prominent actor in plays staged in the village huts including; Maraka Dayadaya, Sinhala Kolla and Yuddha Bhoomiya and Veniciye Welenda. However his father thought of rescuing his son from drama mania and sent him to a grocery store in Balangoda to gain experience in retail. After 10 months of being frustrated with the boring life at the grocery store, Vaas came back to the village to achieve his success in drama.

After few years, Benedict Fernando directed him to the performance on the public stage. He had the opportunity to act in the play Bhayanaka Mankollaya co-produced by Benedict Master and Matthias Fernando. It was during this time that Vass emerged as a singer. He received the opportunity to sing the songs Naade Naade, Vida Satana Maala, Ae Mal Uyane, Nimala Sri Saara in Radio Ceylon under the guidance of H. W.W. Rupasinghe and Tabla Master J. A. Podi Appuhamy.

Meanwhile, he met the musician R. Muttusamy who introduced Vass to cinema. Vaas made his debut cinema appearance in the film Ahankara Sthree directed with A. B. Raj with the popular role 'Juwan'. Then his notable role came through the film Sandesaya directed by Lester James Peries. In the film, he played as the 'Sandeshaya Carrier' who later became the prisoner of the Portuguese. Later, he has played a variety of roles in a number of films. In Duppathage Duka, he acted as IGP, a father in Vanamohini and as Muthusami, the boat owner in Ranmuthu Duwa. The he played as Bandusena in Gatavarayo, as Vijaya's brother in Eya Dan Loku Lamayek, as Nade Guru in Christhu Charithaya, as Nadeeka's father in Vajira and as Kalang's father in Podi Wije and played as Vijay's father in Waradata Danduwam. In the film Uthumaneni directed by Gamini Fonseka, Vass acted as a bedridden paraplegic. From 1954 to 2004, he contributed with more than 70 films across many genre.

In 2002, he was awarded with Rana Thisara Lifetime Award at the 27th Sarasaviya Awards.

Filmography

References

External links 

1922 births
2004 deaths
Sri Lankan male film actors
Sinhalese male actors